John Hubble may refer to:

John Hubble (cricketer) (1881–1965), English cricketer
John Hubble (musician) (born 1928), American jazz trombonist

See also
John Hubbell (disambiguation)